Nikola Stakic (born January 26, 1998) is a Canadian soccer player who currently plays for Alliance United FC in League1 Ontario.

Early life
Born in Toronto, Stakic began his career aged six playing for local side Scarborough Blizzard. He later joined the Toronto FC Academy.

University career
Stakic attended the University of Toronto, playing for the men's soccer team from 2016 to 2021. He was a five-time OUA All-Star.

Club career
In 2015, he began playing with Toronto FC III in League1 Ontario and the Premier Development League.

In 2016, Stakic was called up by Toronto FC II from the Toronto FC Academy. He made his professional debut in the USL on May 15, 2016 in a 2–0 defeat to Charleston Battery.

In 2018, he began playing for Alliance United in League1 Ontario. In 2019, he was named the League1 Ontario Midfielder of the Year and a league First Team All-Star. In 2022, he was once again named league Midfielder of the Year and was named a First Team All-Star.

International career 
In 2013, Stakic made his debut in the Canadian youth program, when he was called up to a U15 national team camp. He was named to the U15 national team for the 2013 Copa de México de Naciones.

Career statistics

References 

1998 births
Living people
Soccer players from Toronto
Association football defenders
Canadian soccer players
Canadian people of Bosnia and Herzegovina descent
Canadian people of Serbian descent
Toronto FC players
Toronto FC II players
USL Championship players
Alliance United FC players
League1 Ontario players
USL League Two players
North Toronto Nitros players
Toronto Varsity Blues soccer players